The Midland Railway 2511 Class was a class of 2-6-0 steam locomotives built by the Schenectady Locomotive Works in the United States, as a supplemental order to the 2501 Class built by Baldwin that same year.  As with that class, the Midland had turned to American locomotive builders, as their own Derby Works had reached capacity, and was unable to produce additional engines at the time, and many British locomotive builders were recovering from an 1897-1898 labor dispute over working hours.

History
The engines were designed and built with more consideration to British practice than the 2501 class had been.  While the engines retained some distinct features of American practice, such as the use of bar frames, they had cleaner lines, with sandboxes placed below the boilers, as well as three-axle rigid tenders.

Numbers
Originally numbered 2511–2520, in the Midland's 1907 renumbering scheme the Schenectadies became No. 2230–2239, in the same order.

Withdrawal
Being non-standard, they had a short life and were all withdrawn between March 1912 and August 1915 and later scrapped.

References 

 
 
 
 Hunt, Dave. American Locomotives of the Midland Railway (No 1 Supplement to Midland Record) 

2511 Class
2-6-0 locomotives
Schenectady Locomotive Works locomotives
Railway locomotives introduced in 1899
Scrapped locomotives